Alexander Mountstuart Elphinstone, 19th Lord Elphinstone and 5th Baron Elphinstone (born 15 April 1980), is a British peer in both the Peerage of Scotland and the Peerage of the United Kingdom.

Early life and family 
Lord Elphinstone is the son of James Elphinstone, 18th Lord Elphinstone, and Willa Mary Gabrielle Chetwode. His mother is the daughter of Major George David Chetwode and Lady Willa Elliot-Murray-Kynynmound, daughter of Victor Elliot-Murray-Kynynmound, 5th Earl of Minto.

He is a great-great-grandson of the 14th Earl of Strathmore and Kinghorne and a great-grandnephew of Queen Elizabeth The Queen Mother. Lord Elphinstone's paternal grandfather, Rev. Hon. Andrew Elphinstone, was a first cousin of Elizabeth II through his mother, the former Lady Mary Bowes-Lyon, who was an elder sister of Queen Elizabeth The Queen Mother.

He was educated at Belhaven Hill School, Eton College, Newcastle University (BSc), and the SOAS, University of London.

Personal life 
He married Nicola J. Hall on 7 July 2007 at Holy Trinity Church, Penn, in Buckinghamshire. The couple have three children:
 Hon. Isla Elizabeth Elphinstone (b. 2008)
 Jago Alexander Elphinstone, Master of Elphinstone (b. 2011)
 The Hon. Rafe Mountstuart Elphinstone (b. 2015).

References

thePeerage.com

1980 births
Living people
People educated at Belhaven Hill School
People educated at Eton College
Alumni of Newcastle University
Alumni of SOAS University of London
Barons in the Peerage of the United Kingdom
Alexander
19
Eldest sons of British hereditary barons

Elphinstone